The fourth season of The Wonder Years aired on ABC from September 19, 1990 to May 15, 1991. This season took place during Kevin Arnold's 1970–71 school year.

Episodes

Fred Savage was present for all episodes.
Olivia d'Abo was absent for 18 episodes.
Danica McKellar was absent for 13 episodes.
Dan Lauria was absent for 10 episodes.
Alley Mills was absent for 8 episodes.
Jason Hervey was absent for 6 episodes.
Josh Saviano was absent for 3 episodes.

References

1990 American television seasons
1991 American television seasons
The Wonder Years seasons
Television series set in 1970
Television series set in 1971